Hurt No More is the second studio album by American singer Mario Winans. It was released by Bad Boy Records and Universal Records on April 20, 2004, in the United States.

Critical reception

Hurt No More received mixed to positive reviews from music critics. Allmusic editor Andy Kellman called the album "one of the finest R&B albums of the year." He found that while "nothing about Hurt No More is radically exceptional, it is, however, full of small surprises [and] as rich as humbled, sincerely sensitive male R&B gets in 2004." USA Today writer Steve Jones wrote that "in his second solo album, Winans spends much of his time taking the blows from all sorts of bad relationships [...] After years of playing in the background, it seems that the talented Winans is ready for his close-up." Vibe editor Tim Bower called the album a "charming throwback." Jon Caramanica from Rolling Stone rated Hurt No More two out of five starts. He felt that "though his melodies are strong, his lyrics lack punch. And while his voice quivers with hurt, it never achieves true angst, suggesting that even heartbreak can be smoothed over."

Commercial performance
Hurt No More debuted at number two on the US Billboard 200 behind Usher's Confessions (2004), and atop the Top R&B/Hip-Hop Albums chart, selling 223,000 copies in its first week. It also debuted and peaked at number three on the UK Albums Chart. "I Don't Wanna Know" was issued as the album's lead single. Based on a sample of the song "Boadicea" by Irish singer Enya from her 1987 self-titled album which came to prominence on The Fugees track "Ready or Not" from the album The Score (1996), the song features a rap by P. Diddy. "I Don't Wanna Know" was released in early 2004 and become a worldwide hit, reaching number in Germany and on the US Billboard Rhythmic Top 40, also peaking at number two on the Billboard Hot 100.

Track listing

Sample credits
"Never Really Was" contains a sample from the composition "Papa Don't Preach" as performed by Madonna. 
"I Don't Wanna Know" contains elements from the song "Story of Boadicea" by Enya.
"You Knew" contains excerpts from the composition "Love Me in a Special Way" as performed by DeBarge.
"How I Made It" contains excerpts from the composition "Celebrate" as performed by The Commodores.

Charts

Weekly charts

Year-end charts

Certifications and sales

References

2004 albums
Mario Winans albums
Bad Boy Records albums